The Prince William Cup was created in 2007 by the Welsh Rugby Union and celebrates 100 years of rugby union history between Wales and South Africa. It is named after the Vice Royal Patron of the WRU, the Prince of Wales, who presented the cup, at the inaugural match, held at the Millennium Stadium in Cardiff on 24 November 2007.

The Trophy
The trophy was chosen by Prince William, from three different designs presented by specialist jewellers. Mari Thomas, from Llanelli, and Nicola Palterman, from Neath won the commission to create the cup. The pair, who have exhibited their jewellery around the world from London to New York City, claim the creation of the 55 cm high, 1.5 mm gauge trophy as their biggest and most elaborate creation to date. The Prince William Cup is inspired by the landscapes of South Africa and Wales. The trophy is silver lined with 23 carat gold plate and is cone shaped tapering from 16 cm at the rim to 8 cm at its base. The trophy is the ninth of its type in world rugby and was presented to the winner of the first clash by Prince William himself.

Controversy
The naming of the cup after Prince William has caused controversy in Wales. Opponents to the name called on the WRU to rename the trophy in honour of Welsh international rugby star Ray Gravell, who died on 31 October 2007. During a tribute to Gravell at the inaugural match the stadium announcer asked the crowd to remember Ray as 'gwir dywysog Cymru', a true prince of Wales. Gravell's funeral was attended by over 10,000 people, including Rhodri Morgan, First Minister of Wales. Following The Cambrian, calling for the cup to be renamed in tribute to Gravell, it was raised in the National Assembly for Wales by Plaid Cymru AM Bethan Jenkins, although the Welsh Government stated it has no view nor responsibility over the issue. Amongst MPs, Labour MP Paul Flynn and Plaid's Adam Price MP also called for the WRU to honour Ray Gravell, as did an online petition.

Matches

Results
 – Summer Test
 – Autumn International

See also
History of rugby union matches between South Africa and Wales

References

History of rugby union matches between South Africa and Wales
Rugby union controversies
Rugby union international rivalry trophies
2007 establishments in Wales
2007 establishments in South Africa
William, Prince of Wales